The Screech Owls is a Canadian mystery TV series based on Roy MacGregor's The Screech Owls book series, that originally aired on YTV from September 1, 2000, to February 1, 2002. 
It was nominated for Best Children's or Youth Series or Program at the 16th Gemini Awards in 2001.  Jonathan Malen was nominated at the Young Artist's Awards. In the USA, it was aired alongside other Canadian imports on The Hub Network.

Plot
The plot centers on "The Screech Owls", who are one of the great contenders of the Lapine Cup. They  solve mysteries that are occurring in the town of Tamarack, between the games.

Cast 
 Jonathan Malen as Wayne "Nish" Nishikawa
 William Greenblatt as Travis Lindsay
 Nicole Hardy as Sarah Cuthbertson
 Fraser McGregor as Simon Milliken
 Peter Oldring as Mr. Dillinger
 Neil Crone as Muck Murno
 Nicole Dicker as Samantha McGuire

Characters 
Wayne Nishikawa, called "Nish" by his friends,  is the Screech Owls' captain. He enjoys joking and making pranks to his friends. Nish likes collecting hockey cards and loves T-shirts, baseball, and alternative music.
Travis Lindsay has much natural ability and good leadership skills. He is a great skater and stickhandler. He is passionate about various sports.
Sarah Cuthbertson is the best skater and one of the best point-scorers on the team. Sarah is also considered one of the best upcoming female players in hockey.
Simon Milliken is the smallest and most fearful Screech Owl, but he is the hardest working player on the team. He often joins the adventures of the Screech Owls.
Mr. Dillinger is the assistant coach of the Screech Owls.
Muck Murno is the coach of the Screech Owls.
Samantha McGuire is a very talented girl originally from the West who joins the Screech Owls during the second season. The protagonists discover that her family was forced to move away all the time the older brother committed crimes. This changes when the family settles in Tamarack; Sam, not wanting to abandon her new friends, encourages her brother to change his life.

References

External links
 

2000 Canadian television series debuts
2002 Canadian television series endings
2000s Canadian children's television series
Canadian children's mystery television series
Canadian children's education television series
English-language television shows
YTV (Canadian TV channel) original programming
Television shows filmed in Toronto
Television series about teenagers
Television series by Corus Entertainment
Junior ice hockey in Canada